The first election to Carmarthen District Council following the re-organization of local government in Wales was held in May 1973.  It was followed by the 1976 election. On the same day there were elections to the other local authorities and community councils in Wales.

Results

Abergwili and Llanllawddog (one seat)

Abernant (one seat)

Carmarthen Town Ward One (four seats)

Carmarthen Town Ward Two (two seats)

Carmarthen Town Ward Three (three seats)

Cilymaenllwyd (one seat)

Cynwyl Elfed and Llanpumsaint (one seat)

Henllanfallteg (one seat)

Laugharne Township (two seats)

Llanarthney and Llanddarog (three seats)

Llandyfaelog (two seats)

Llangeler (two seats)

Llanfihangel-ar-Arth (one seat)

Llanfihangel Rhos-y-Corn (one seat)

Llangain (one seat)

Llangynnwr (two seats)

Llangyndeyrn (two seats)

Llanllwni (two seats)

Newcastle Emlyn (one seat)

St Clears (two seats)

Whitland (one seat)

References

1973
1973 Welsh local elections
20th century in Carmarthenshire